The surname Ness may refer to:

Politics 
 Don Ness (born 1974), American politician from Duluth, Minnesota
 James Van Ness (1808–1872), seventh mayor of San Francisco, USA from 1855 to 1856
 Steinar Ness (born 1959), Norwegian politician for the Centre Party

Arts and entertainment 
 Evaline Ness (1911–1986), American commercial artist and illustrator for award-winning children's books
 Jennifer Ness (born 1972), English actress best known for her role as murderer Kris Yates in the ITV drama Bad Girls
 Mari Ness (born c. 1971), American poet and author
 Mike Ness (born 1962), American guitarist, vocalist, and chief songwriter for the punk rock band Social Distortion
 Patrick Ness (born 1971), American author, journalist and lecturer
 Tigilau Ness (born c. 1954), Niuean New Zealand activist and reggae artist

Sports 
 Aaron Ness (born 1990), American ice hockey people
 Brad Ness (born 1974), Australian wheelchair basketballer
 David Ness (born 1902), Scottish footballer
 Erin Ness (born 1978), American poker player, former photo producer for Maxim magazine, and television personality
 Harry Ness (1885–1957), a footballer
 Jack Ness (1885–1957), first baseman in Major League Baseball
 Jamie Ness (born 1991), Scottish footballer
 Nate Ness (born 1986), American football cornerback and safety
 Ness Flowers, Welsh former rugby player
 Thormod Ness (born 1972), Norwegian football coach and former player

Education 
 Carl Van Ness, curator and historian at the University of Florida
 Immanuel Ness, teaches political science at Brooklyn College of the City University of New York

Other fields 
 Arlen Ness, American entrepreneur and motorcyclist
 Charles Ness, a senior Royal Air Force commander
 Eliot Ness (1903–1957), American Prohibition agent
 Helge Ness (1861–1928), Norwegian botanist
 Terje Ness (born 1972), Norwegian chef

See also 
 Ness (disambiguation)
 Van Ness (disambiguation)

Scottish surnames